Nick Anna Maria Francois Kuipers (born 8 October 1992) is a Dutch professional footballer who plays as a centre-back for Indonesian club Persib Bandung. He formerly played for MVV Maastricht and ADO Den Haag. Besides the Netherlands, he has played in Indonesia.

Career
The defender started his career in his hometown with RKVVL. He joined later in the youth team of MVV Maastricht and was promoted to the Jupiler League team for the 2010/2012 season. Kuipers played his senior debut on 13 August 2010 for MVV Maastricht against Volendam in a 2–2 draw in the Eerste Divisie

Honours

Individual
 APPI Indonesian Football Award Best 11: 2021–22 '''

References

External links
 

1992 births
Living people
Association football central defenders
Dutch footballers
Eredivisie players
Eerste Divisie players
Liga 1 (Indonesia) players
MVV Maastricht players
ADO Den Haag players
FC Emmen players
Persib Bandung players
Footballers from Maastricht
Dutch expatriate footballers
Expatriate footballers in Indonesia
Dutch expatriate sportspeople in Indonesia